Katsyaryna Andreeva (Belarusian: Кацярына Андрэева; Russian: Катерина Андреева; real name: Katsyaryna Andreevna Bakhvalava; Belarusian: Кацярына Андрэеўна Бахвалава) (born on November 2, 1993, in Minsk, Belarus) is a journalist from Belarus. She worked for the television channel Belsat TV. She broadcast the event from the Square of Changes in Minsk where Raman Bandarenka was beaten to death in 2020. She was arrested on site on November 15, 2020.

Early life and career 
She was born in Minsk in a family of journalists. She studied for about two and a half years in Minsk State Linguistic University, then she moved to Spain. She taught English there for two years. Then she came back home, got to work for the newspaper Nasha Niva as a journalist. In 2017, she moved to Belsat TV.

Katsyaryna Andreeva with Igar Ilyash wrote the book Belarusian Donbas in 2020. The book is about how the Belarusian people and organizations take part in the War in Donbas for the Russian separatist forces side. The Belarusian regime deemed it to be extremist and in 2021, via court decision, banned the book and its content countrywide.

Katsyaryna was first arrested in 2017 in Orsha. On September 12, 2020, she was arrested by OMON for a live broadcast of a women's march in Minsk and was locked up for three days.

Criminal procedure 
Together with journalist Darya Chultsova, she was a suspect in a criminal case on organizing actions that attack public order. On November 15, 2020, in Minsk, both broadcast the event of a cruel raid of the Militsiya and its affiliates at the Square of Changes, the place where Raman Bandarenka was beaten to death and the people peacefully stood to support the dead one there. She was not freed after the arrest at the square. She was moved to a prison in Zhodzina, where she was held until court trial. On November 24, 2020, ten organizations, including the Viasna Human Rights Centre, the Belarusian Association of Journalists, the Belarusian Helsinki Committee, made a joint statement and recognized her as a political prisoner.

At a Minsk court hearing led by the judge Natalia Buguk on February 18, 2021, Andreeva und Chultsova were sentenced to serve two years in prison for pushing 2020 Belarusian protests. The public prosecutor was Alina Kasyanchyk, the investigator was Ihar Kurylovich.  On April 23, 2021, Minsk City Court declined an appeal on the sentence.

Reaction 
On February 8, 2021, the US Embassy in Belarus made a statement, asking to make Chultsova and Andreeva free.

On February 4, 2021, godparenthood for the political prisoner was undertaken by Delara Burkhardt, a Member of the European Parliament. Following the sentencing, on February 18, 2021, the President of Poland Andrzej Duda made a public call for amnesty for Chultsova and Andreeva.

In accordance with the decision of the Council of the European Union on June 21, 2021, judge Natalia Buguk was included in the list of people and organizations sanctioned in relation to human rights violations in Belarus for, among other things, “numerous politically motivated rulings against journalists and protesters, in particular the sentencing of Katsyaryna Bakhvalava (Andreyeva) and Darya Chultsova” and violations of rights of defence and to a fair trial. By the same decision, the Assistant Prosecutor at the Frunzyenski District Court of Minsk Alina Kasyanchyk was included in the sanctions list. She was held responsible, among other things, for prosecuting journalists for “recording peaceful protests, based on the groundless charges of ‛conspiracy’ and ‛violating public order.’” Senior investigator of the Frunzyenski District Department of the Investigative Committee Ihar Kurylovich was put on the list too for, among other things, preparing a politically motivated criminal case against the journalists who recorded peaceful protests.

Awards 
On December 10, 2020, she was named Journalist of the Year (2020).

On March 10, 2021, she got the Award named after Dariusz Fikus by the Press Club Polska.

Together with Darya Chultsova and Katsiaryna Barysevich, on April 9, 2021, she got the Ales Lipay (the founder of BelaPAN) Award "Honor of Journalism."

Together with Darya Chultsova on June 7, 2021, she got the Axel-Springer-Preis.

Together with Darya Chultsova on June 10, 2021, she got the Courage in Journalism Award, a prize by the International Women's Media Foundation.

Together with Darya Chultsova, Katsiaryna Barysevich, and others, on August 12, 2021, she got the Free Media Award.

Together with Darya Chultsova on October 15, 2021, she got the Prix Europa in the category of the "European Journalist of 2021."

Appraisal 
"[They are] strong in spirit, have no doubt in the right [of them], supported by friends, colleagues and the people that they do not know at all – such Katya and Dasha will be put in textbooks," Aksana Kolb, editor-in-chief of Novy Chas, wrote on the eve of their sentencing.

Personal life 
She married journalist Igar Ilyash in 2016.

Books 
 "Belarusian Donbas" (together with Igar Ilyash) (2020)

References

External links 
 Katsyaryna Andreeva's page on the website of the Viasna Human Rights Centre

1993 births
Journalists from Minsk
Living people
Political prisoners according to Viasna Human Rights Centre
Belarusian women journalists
Free Media Awards winners